Wealth inequality in the United States is the unequal distribution of assets among residents of the United States. Wealth commonly includes the values of any homes, automobiles, personal valuables, businesses, savings, and investments, as well as any associated debts.

Although different from income inequality, the two are related. Wealth is usually not used for daily expenditures or factored into household budgets, but combined with income, it represents a family's total opportunity to secure stature and a meaningful standard of living, or to pass their class status down to their children. Moreover, wealth provides for both short- and long-term financial security, bestows social prestige, contributes to political power, and can be leveraged to obtain more wealth. Hence, wealth provides mobility and agency—the ability to act. The accumulation of wealth enables a variety of freedoms, and removes limits on life that one might otherwise face.

Federal Reserve data indicates that as of Q4 2021, the top 1% of households in the United States held 32.3% of the country's wealth, while the bottom 50% held 2.6%. In recent decades, wealth inequality has substantially increased in the United States. From 1989 to 2019, wealth became increasingly concentrated in the top 1% and top 10%  due in large part to corporate stock ownership concentration in those segments of the population; the bottom 50% own little if any corporate stock. From an international perspective, the difference in US median and mean wealth per adult is over 600%. A 2011 study found that US citizens across the political spectrum dramatically underestimate the current level of wealth inequality in the US, and would prefer a far more egalitarian distribution of wealth.

During the COVID-19 pandemic, the wealth held by billionaires in the U.S. increased by 70%, with 2020 marking the steepest increase in billionaires' share of wealth on record.

Statistics

In 2007, the top 20% of the wealthiest Americans possessed 80% of all financial assets. In 2007 the richest 1% of the American population owned 35% of the country's total wealth, and the next 19% owned 51%.  The top 20% of Americans owned 86% of the country's wealth and the bottom 80% of the population owned 14%.  In 2011, financial inequality was greater than inequality in total wealth, with the top 1% of the population owning 43%, the next 19% of Americans owning 50%, and the bottom 80% owning 7%.  However, after the Great Recession, which began in 2007, the share of total wealth owned by the top 1% of the population grew from 35% to 37%, and that owned by the top 20% of Americans grew from 86% to 88%.  The Great Recession also caused a drop of 36% in median household wealth, but a drop of only 11% for the top 1%, further widening the gap between the top 1% and the bottom 99%.

According to PolitiFact and other sources, in 2011, the 400 wealthiest Americans had more wealth than half of all Americans combined. Inherited wealth may help explain why many Americans who have become rich may have had a substantial head start. In September 2012, according to the Institute for Policy Studies, over 60 percent of the Forbes richest 400 Americans grew up in substantial privilege.

In 2013, wealth inequality in the U.S. was greater than in most developed countries, other than Switzerland and Denmark.  In the United States, the use of offshore holdings is exceptionally small compared to Europe, where much of the wealth of the top percentiles is kept in offshore holdings. According to a 2014 Credit Suisse study, the ratio of wealth to household income is the highest it has been since the Great Depression.

According to a paper published by the Federal Reserve in 1997, "For most households, pensions and Social Security are the most important sources of income during retirement, and the promised benefit stream constitutes a sizable fraction of household wealth" and "including pensions and Social Security in net worth makes the distribution more even".

In Inequality for All—a 2013 documentary, narrated by Robert Reich, in which he argues that income inequality is the defining issue of the United States—Reich states that 95% of economic gains following the economic recovery which began in 2009 went to the top 1% of Americans (by net worth) (HNWI).

A September 2017 study by the Federal Reserve reported that the top 1% owned 38.5% of the country's wealth in 2016.

According to a June 2017 report by the Boston Consulting Group, around 70% of the nation's wealth will be in the hands of millionaires and billionaires by 2021.

A 2019 study by economists Emmanuel Saez and Gabriel Zucman found that the average effective tax rate paid by the richest 400 families (0.003%) in the US was 23 percent, more than a percentage point lower than the 24.2 percent paid by the bottom half of American households. The Urban-Brookings Tax Policy Center found that the bottom 20 percent of earners pay an average 2.9 percent effective income tax rate federally, while the richest 1 percent paid an effective 29.6 percent tax rate and the top 0.01 percent paid an effective 30.6 percent tax rate. In 2019, the Institute on Taxation and Economic Policy found that when state and federal taxes are taken into account, however, the poorest 20 percent pay an effective 20.2 percent rate while the top 1 percent pay an effective 33.7 percent rate.

Using Federal Reserve data, the Washington Center for Equitable Growth reported in August 2019 that: "Looking at the cumulative growth of wealth disaggregated by group, we see that the bottom 50 percent of wealth owners experienced no net wealth growth since 1989. At the other end of the spectrum, the top 1 percent have seen their wealth grow by almost 300 percent since 1989. Although cumulative wealth growth was relatively similar among all wealth groups through the 1990s, the top 1 percent and bottom 50 percent diverged around 2000."

According to an analysis of Survey of Consumer Finances data from 2019 by the People's Policy Project, 79% of the country's wealth is owned by millionaires and billionaires.

Also in 2019, PolitiFact reported that three people (less than the 400 reported in 2011) had more wealth than the bottom half of all Americans.

During the COVID-19 pandemic, the wealth held by billionaires in the U.S. increased by 70%. According to the 2022 World Inequality Report, "2020 marked the steepest increase in global billionaires’ share of wealth on record."

Early 20th century
Simon Kuznets, using income tax records and his own research-based estimates, showed a reduction of about 10% in the movement of national income toward the top 10% of wealth-owners, a reduction from about 45–50% in 1913 to about 30–35% in 1948. This period spans both The Great Depression and World War II, events with significant economic consequences. This is called the Great Compression.

1989 to 2020

Effect of stock market gains
The Federal Reserve publishes information on the distribution of household assets, debt, and equity (net worth) by quarter going back to 1989. The tables below summarize the net worth data, in real terms (adjusted for inflation), for 1989 to 2020, and 2016 to 2020. Journalist Matthew Yglesias explained in June 2019 how the ownership of stock has driven wealth inequality, as the bottom 50% has minimal stock ownership: "...[T]he bottom half of the income distribution had a huge share of its wealth tied up in real estate while owning essentially no shares of corporate stock. The top 1 percent, by contrast, wasn't just rich — it was specifically rich in terms of owning companies, both stock in publicly traded ones ("corporate equities") and shares of closely held ones ("private businesses")...So the value of those specific assets — assets that people in the bottom half of the distribution never had a chance to own in the first place — soared."

NPR also reported in 2017 that the bottom 50% of U.S. households (by net worth) have little stock market exposure (neither directly nor indirectly through 401k plans), writing: "That means the stock market rally can only directly benefit around half of all Americans — and substantially fewer than it would have a decade ago when nearly two-thirds of families owned stock."

The table below shows changes from Q4 2016 (the end of the Obama Administration) to Q2 2020.

Wealth and income
There is an important distinction between income and wealth. Income refers to a flow of money over time, commonly in the form of a wage or salary; wealth is a collection of assets owned, minus liabilities. In essence, income is what people receive through work, retirement, or social welfare whereas wealth is what people own. While the two are related, income inequality alone is insufficient for understanding economic inequality for two reasons:
 It does not accurately reflect an individual's economic position
 Income does not portray the severity of financial inequality in the United States.

In 1998, Dennis Gilbert asserted that the standard of living of the working and middle classes is dependent primarily upon income and wages, while the rich tend to rely on wealth, distinguishing them from the vast majority of Americans.

The United States Census Bureau formally defines income as money received on a regular basis (exclusive of certain money receipts such as capital gains) before payments on personal income taxes, social security, union dues, medicare deductions, etc. By this official measure, the wealthiest families may have low income, but the value of their assets may be enough money to support their lifestyle. Dividends from trusts or gains in the stock market do not fall under the aforementioned definition of income, but are commonly the primary source of capital for the ultra-wealthy. Retired people also have little income, but may have a high net worth, because of money saved over time.

Additionally, income does not capture the extent of wealth inequality. Wealth is most commonly obtained over time, through the steady investing of income, and the growth of assets. The income of one year does not typically encompass the accumulation over a lifetime. Income statistics cover too narrow a time span for it to be an adequate indicator of financial inequality. For example, the Gini coefficient for wealth inequality increased from 0.80 in 1983 to 0.84 in 1989. In the same year, 1989, the Gini coefficient for income was only 0.52. The Gini coefficient is an economic tool on a scale from 0 to 1 that measures the level of inequality. 1 signifies perfect inequality and 0 represents perfect equality. From this data, it is evident that in 1989 there was a discrepancy in the level of economic disparity;  the extent of wealth inequality was significantly higher than income inequality. Recent research shows that many households, in particular, those headed by young parents (younger than 35), minorities, and individuals with low educational attainment, display very little accumulation. Many have no financial assets and their total net worth is also low.

According to the Congressional Budget Office, between 1979 and 2007, incomes of the top 1% of Americans grew by an average of 275%. (Note: The IRS insists that comparisons of adjusted gross income pre-1987 and post-1987 are complicated by large changes in the definition of AGI, which led to households within the top income quintile reporting more of their income on their individual income tax form's AGI, rather than reporting their business income in separate corporate tax returns, or not reporting certain non-taxable income in their AGI at all, such as municipal bond income. In addition, IRS studies consistently show that a majority of households in the top income quintile have moved to a lower quintile within one decade. There are even more changes to households in the top 1%. Without including those data here, a reader is likely to assume households in the top 1% are almost the same from year to year.) In 2009, people in the top 1% of taxpayers made $343,927 or more. According to US economist Joseph Stiglitz the richest 1% of Americans gained 93% of the additional income created in 2010.

A study by Emmanuel Saez and Piketty showed that the top 10 percent of earners took more than half of the country's total income in 2012, the highest level recorded since the government began collecting the relevant data a century ago. People in the top one percent were three times more likely to work more than 50 hours a week, were more likely to be self-employed, and earned a fifth of their income as capital income. The top one percent was composed of many professions and had an annual turnover rate of more than 25%. The five most common professions were managers, physicians, administrators, lawyers, and teachers.

A 2022 study in PNAS found that earnings inequality in the United States did not increase over the preceding decade, marking the first reversal of rising earnings inequality since 1980. The reversal was due to a shrinking wage gap between low-wage workers and median-wage earners, which was due to broadly rising pay in low-wage professions. At the same time, the gap between median-wage workers and top earners widened.

U.S. stock market ownership distribution

In March 2017, NPR summarized the distribution of U.S. stock market ownership (direct and indirect through mutual funds) in the U.S., which is highly concentrated among the wealthiest families:
52% of U.S. adults owned stock in 2016. Ownership peaked at 65% in 2007 and fell significantly due to the Great Recession.
As of 2013, the top 1% of households owned 38% of the stock market wealth.
As of 2013, the top 10% own 81% of the stock wealth, the next 10% (80th to 90th percentile) own 11% and the bottom 80% own 8%.

The Federal Reserve reported the median value of stock ownership by income group for 2016:
Bottom 20% own $5,800.
20th-40th percentile own $10,000.
40th to 60th percentile own $15,500.
60th to 80th percentile own $31,700.
80th to 89th percentile own $82,000.
Top 10% own $365,000.

NPR reported that when politicians reference the stock market as a measure of economic success, that success is not relevant to nearly half of Americans. Further, more than one-third of Americans who work full-time have no access to pensions or retirement accounts such as 401(k)s that derive their value from financial assets like stocks and bonds. The NYT reported that the percentage of workers covered by generous defined-benefit pension plans has declined from 62% in 1983 to 17% by 2016. While some economists consider an increase in the stock market to have a "wealth effect" that increases economic growth, economists like Former Dallas Federal Reserve Bank President Richard Fisher believe those effects are limited.

Causes of wealth inequality

Essentially, the wealthy possess greater financial opportunities that allow their money to make more money. Earnings from the stock market or mutual funds are reinvested to produce a larger return. Over time, the sum that is invested becomes progressively more substantial. Those who are not wealthy, however, do not have the resources to enhance their opportunities and improve their economic position. Rather, "after debt payments, poor families are constrained to spend the remaining income on items that will not produce wealth and will depreciate over time." Scholar David B. Grusky notes that "62 percent of households headed by single parents are without savings or other financial assets." Net indebtedness generally prevents the poor from having any opportunity to accumulate wealth and thereby better their conditions.

Economic inequality is also a result of difference in income. Factors that contribute to this gap in wages are things such as level of education, labor market demand and supply, gender differences, growth in technology, and personal abilities. The quality and level of education that a person has often corresponds to their skill level, which is justified by their income. Wages are also determined by the "market price of a skill" at that current time. Although gender inequality is a separate social issue, it plays a role in economic inequality. According to the U.S. Census Report, in America the median full-time salary for women is 77 percent of that for men. Also contributing to the wealth inequality in the U.S., both unskilled and skilled workers are being replaced by machinery. The Seven Pillars Institute for Global Finance and Ethics argues that because of this "technological advance", the income gap between workers and owners has widened.

Income inequality contributes to wealth inequality. For example, economist Emmanuel Saez wrote in June 2016 that the top 1% of families captured 52% of the total real income (GDP) growth per family from 2009 to 2015. From 2009 to 2012, the top 1% captured 91% of the income gains.

Nepotism perpetuates and increases wealth inequality. Wealthy families pass down their assets allowing future generations to develop even more wealth. The poor, on the other hand, are less able to leave inheritances to their children leaving the latter with little or no wealth on which to build. Wealthy parents often use their economic or political power to advantage their own children, such as by providing extra funding for education, excluding poor families from the local community or schools (usually through exclusionary zoning), using social connections to provide opportunities for advancement like internships, and allowing children to take entrepreneurial risks without risking homelessness or destitution.

Corresponding to financial resources, the wealthy strategically organize their money so that it will produce profit. Affluent people are more likely to allocate their money to financial assets such as stocks, bonds, and other investments which hold the possibility of capital appreciation. Those who are not wealthy are more likely to have their money in savings accounts and home ownership. This difference comprises the largest reason for the continuation of wealth inequality in America: the rich are accumulating more assets while the middle and working classes are just getting by. As of 2007, the richest 1% held about 38% of all privately held wealth in the United States. while the bottom 90% held 73.2% of all debt. According to The New York Times, the richest 1 percent in the United States now own more wealth than the bottom 90 percent.

However, other studies argue that higher average savings rate will contribute to the reduction of the share of wealth owned by the rich. The reason is that the rich in wealth are not necessarily the individuals with the highest income. Therefore, the relative wealth share of poorer quintiles of the population would increase if the savings rate of income is very large, although the absolute difference from the wealthiest will increase.

The nature of tax policies in America has been suggested by economists and politicians such as Emmanuel Saez, Thomas Piketty, and Barack Obama to perpetuate economic inequality in America by steering large sums of wealth into the hands of the wealthiest Americans. The mechanism for this is that when the wealthy avoid paying taxes, wealth concentrates to their coffers and the poor go into debt.

The economist Joseph Stiglitz argues that "Strong unions have helped to reduce inequality, whereas weaker unions have made it easier for CEOs, sometimes working with market forces that they have helped shape, to increase it." The long fall in unionization in the U.S. since WWII has seen a corresponding rise in the inequality of wealth and income.

Some tax policies subsidize wealthy people more than poor people; critics often argue the home mortgage interest deduction should be abolished because it provides more tax relief for people in higher tax brackets and with more expensive homes, and that poorer people are more often renters and therefore less likely to be able to use this deduction at all. Regressive taxes include payroll taxes, sales taxes, and fuel taxes.

A 2022 study in the American Economic Journal found that greater economic inequality in the United States than in Europe was not because of the nature of tax and transfer systems in the United States. The study found that the U.S. redistributes a greater share of its wealth to the bottom half of the income distribution than any European country. The study found instead that Europe had less economic inequality because it had been more successful at ensuring that the bottom half of the income distribution are able to get relatively well-paying jobs.

Racial disparities
The wealth gap between white and black families nearly tripled from $85,000 in 1984 to $236,500 in 2009.

A Brandeis University Institute on Assets and Social Policy paper cites the number of years of homeownership, household income, unemployment, education, and inheritance  as leading causes for the growth of the gap, concluding homeownership to be the most important. Inheritance can directly link the disadvantaged economic position and prospects of today's blacks to the disadvantaged positions of their parents' and grandparents' generations, according to a report done by Robert B. Avery and Michael S. Rendall that pointed out "one in three white households will receive a substantial inheritance during their lifetime compared to only one in ten black households." In the journal Sociological Perspectives, Lisa Keister reports that family size and structure during childhood "are related to racial differences in adult wealth accumulation trajectories, allowing whites to begin accumulating high-yield assets earlier in life."

The article "America's Financial Divide" added context to racial wealth inequality, stating:

Relying on data from Credit Suisse and Brandeis University's Institute on Assets and Social Policy, the Harvard Business Review in the article "How America's Wealthiest Black Families Invest Money" stated:

According to Inequality.org, the median black family is only worth $1,700 when durables are deducted. In contrast, the median white family holds $116,800 of wealth using the same accounting methods. Today, using Wolff's analysis, the median African American family holds a mere 1.5 percent of median white American family wealth.

A recent piece on Eurweb/Electronic Urban Report, "Black Wealth Hardly Exists, Even When You Include NBA, NFL and Rap Stars", stated this about the difference between black middle-class families and white middle-class families:

Author Lilian Singh wrote on why the perceptions about black life created by media are misleading in the American Prospect article "Black Wealth On TV: Realities Don't Match Perceptions":

According to an article by the Pew Research Center, the median wealth of non-Hispanic black households fell nearly 38% from 2010 to 2013. During that time, the median wealth of those households fell from $16,600 to $13,700. The median wealth of Hispanic families fell 14.3% as well, from $16,000 to $14,000. Despite the median net worth of all households in the United States decreasing with time, as of 2013, white households had a median net worth of $141,900 while black house households had a median net worth of just $11,000. Hispanic households had a median net worth of just $13,700 over that time as well.

Effect on democracy

A 2014 study by researchers at Princeton and Northwestern concludes that government policies reflect the desires of the wealthy, and that the vast majority of American citizens have "minuscule, near-zero, statistically non-significant impact upon public policy ... when a majority of citizens disagrees with economic elites and/or with organized interests, they generally lose." When Fed chair Janet Yellen was questioned by Bernie Sanders about the study at a congressional hearing in May 2014, she responded "There's no question that we've had a trend toward growing inequality" and that this trend "can shape [and] determine the ability of different groups to participate equally in a democracy and have grave effects on social stability over time."

In Capital in the Twenty-First Century, French economist Thomas Piketty argues that "extremely high levels" of wealth inequality are "incompatible with the meritocratic values and principles of social justice fundamental to modern democratic societies" and that "the risk of a drift towards oligarchy is real and gives little reason for optimism about where the United States is headed."

Effect on health and well-being

The 2019 World Happiness Report shows the US slipping to 19th place due to increasing wealth inequality, along with rising healthcare costs, surging addiction rates, and an unhealthy work–life balance.

Proposals to reduce wealth inequality

Estate tax
There is a political debate over the estate tax in the United States, which reduces inequality by taxing the estate of large quantities of wealth. The Tax Cuts and Jobs Act of 2017 doubled the exemption of estates by increasing the exemption from $5.49 million in 2017 to $11.18 million in 2018.  This increase in estate exemption was estimated to affect about 3,200 estates in 2018.

A 2021 investigation using leaked IRS documents found more than half of the richest 100 Americans use grantor retained annuity trusts to avoid paying estate taxes when they die.

As of 2022 individual estates under $12.06 million, and $24.12 million for married couples, are exempt from federal tax.  Estates with values beyond $12.06 million are taxed on a sliding scale from 18% to 40%.  The lowest bracket of 18% affects estates from $12.06 to $12.07 million and quickly increases to 40% affecting estates $13.06 million and above.  The doubled exemption from the Tax Cuts and Jobs Act of 2017 is scheduled to expire in 2025, reducing the estate exemption to approximately $6.2 million. In addition, the maximum gift tax is scheduled to increase from 40% to 45% in 2026.

Increased tax
In President Joe Biden's proposed budget for 2023 there are two proposed tax changes for households with wealth above $100 million.  First, is a new "minimum tax" at death for unrealized capital gains above $1 million.  Second is to realized capital gains as ordinary income; which is expected to effectively raise the percent of capital taxed from 23.8% to 43.4%.  Combined it is estimated that these tax changes will place these households at an effective tax rate of 61.1%, which is nearly double the effective tax rate in 2022.

Inheritance tax

As of 2022, there is no federal inheritance tax in the United States, which occurs after an estate is taxed and is passed on to surviving individual(s) and/or organization.  As of 2022, six states (Iowa, Kentucky, Maryland, Nebraska, New Jersey, and Pennsylvania) impose a state level inheritance tax.

Taxation of wealth
Senator Bernie Sanders pitched the idea of a wealth tax in the US in 2014. Later, Senator Elizabeth Warren proposed an annual tax on wealth in January 2019, specifically a 2% tax for wealth over $50 million and another 1% surcharge on wealth over $1 billion. Wealth is defined as including all asset classes, including financial assets and real estate. Economists Emmanuel Saez and Gabriel Zucman estimated that about 75,000 households (less than 0.1%) would pay the tax. The tax would raise around $2.75 trillion over 10 years, roughly 1% GDP on average per year. This would raise the total tax burden for those subject to the wealth tax from 3.2% relative to their wealth under current law to about 4.3% on average, versus the 7.2% for the bottom 99% families. For scale, the federal budget deficit in 2018 was 3.9% GDP and is expected to rise towards 5% GDP over the next decade.

The plan received both praise and criticism. Two billionaires, Michael Bloomberg and Howard Schultz, criticized the proposal as "unconstitutional" and "ridiculous," respectively. Economist Paul Krugman wrote in January 2019 that polls indicate the idea of taxing the rich more is very popular. In 2021, officials in the state of Washington considered proposals to tax wealthy residents within the state.

Limit or tax stock buybacks

Senators Charles Schumer and Bernie Sanders advocated limiting stock buybacks to reduce income and wealth inequality in January 2019. "The purported policy goals of the Excise Tax are to raise revenue for other legislative initiatives, encourage reinvestment by public companies of funds that otherwise might be earmarked for a buyback, and to curb stock buybacks, which proponents of the tax argue inappropriately enrich corporate executives and wealthy shareholders and enable tax avoidance." This is a way for companies to make back more money on their own stocks, but with this, they added the !5 tax to it all. "The new 1% excise tax on corporate stock buybacks — a late addition to President Joe Biden’s sweeping tax, health and climate package — adds a new levy to the controversial practice."

See also

 Affluence in the United States
 Distribution of wealth in Europe
 Citizens United v. Federal Election Commission
 Criticism of credit scoring systems in the United States
 Donor Class
 Income inequality in the United States
 Monetary policy 
 Net worth
 Occupy movement
 Occupy Wall Street
 Oligarchy
 Panama Papers
 Paradise Papers
 Pareto principle
 Plutocracy
 Power elite
 Redistribution of wealth
 Tax policy and economic inequality in the United States 
 The Divide: American Injustice in the Age of the Wealth Gap
 Wealth concentration
 Wealth in the United States
 We are the 99%
 American upper class
 List of Americans by net worth

References

Further reading
 Alexandra Thornton and Galen Hendricks, Ending Special Tax Treatment for the Very Wealthy, Center for American Progress, June 4, 2019. Ending Special Tax Treatment for the Very Wealthy The report summarizes the problem (gross inequality) and its cause ("special tax treatment for the [extremely rich]"), and specific "ways to rebalance the tax code and put the economy on a better track."
 Moritz Kuhn, Moritz Schularick, and Ulrike I. Steins. 2020. "Income and Wealth Inequality in America, 1949–2016." Journal of Political Economy.
 

Capital (economics)
Wealth in the United States
Economic inequality in the United States
Distribution of wealth
Articles containing video clips